The Hackberry Wind Project is a US $350 million wind farm in Shackelford County, Texas. The project consists of 72 Siemens wind turbines with a total capacity of 166 megawatts. The energy is used by residents of the City of Austin and surrounding communities.  Construction on the project began in January 2008 and was finished in December 2008, on-time and under budget.

See also

List of wind farms
Wind power in the United States
Wind power in Texas

References

Energy infrastructure completed in 2008
Wind farms in Texas
Buildings and structures in Shackelford County, Texas